France participated at the 2015 European Games, in Baku, Azerbaijan from 12 to 28 June 2015.

Medalists

Archery

France has qualified for three quota places in both the men's and the women's archery events at the Games, and as a result has also qualified for the team events.

Gymnastics

Aerobic
France has a total of six athletes after the performance at the 2013 Aerobic Gymnastics European Championships. One gymnast from pairs must compete in the group making the total athletes to 6.
 Pairs – 1 pair of 2 athletes
 Groups – 1 team of 5 athletes

Artistic
Women's – 3 quota places

Rhythmic
France has qualified one athlete after the performance at the 2013 Rhythmic Gymnastics European Championships.
 Individual – 1 quota place

Trampoline
France qualified two athletes based on the results at the 2014 European Trampoline Championships. The gymnasts will compete in both the individual and the synchronized event.
 Men's – 2 quota place
 Women's – 2 quota places

Judo

Men
60 kg – Vincent Limare
66 kg – Loïc Korval, David Larose
73 kg – Pierre Duprat, Florent Urani
81 kg – Loïc Pietri
90 kg – Alexandre Iddir
100 kg – Cyrille Maret
 +100 kg – Teddy Riner

Women
52 kg – Annabelle Euranie
57 kg – Laëtitia Blot, Automne Pavia
63 kg – Clarisse Agbegnenou
70 kg – Gévrise Émane, Marie-Ève Gahié
78 kg – Madeleine Malonga, Audrey Tcheuméo
 +78 kg – Émilie Andéol

Triathlon

Men's – Leo Bergere, Lucas Jacolin
Women's – Leonie Periault, Margot Garabedian

References

Nations at the 2015 European Games
European Games
2015